Anicius Acilius Aginantius (or Aginatius) Faustus ( 483–508), also known as Faustus albus ("white"), was a Roman politician under Odoacer's rule. His brothers included Rufius Achilius Maecius Placidus, and Rufius Achilius Sividius.

Life 
Faustus' career is attested by two inscriptions on seats of the Colosseum.

He is attested as praefectus urbi of Rome in an inscription celebrating his work in restoring an image of Minerva damaged by a falling roof during a riot. The riot can be identified with the civil war that led to the deposition and death of Emperor Anthemius in 472, while the restoration could have been performed under Odoacer, but before 483.

In 483 he was appointed consul, without colleague. It is probable that he was not recognised by the Eastern court.

In 502-503 he could have been appointed praefectus urbi for the second time. In those years he was contacted by Magnus Felix Ennodius to be appointed advocatus fisci in Liguria. Ennodius wrote him also in 506 and 508. He might also be the recipient of a letter by Avitus of Vienne, and also of a letter from Theoderic the Great to Faustus, praepositus.

Notes

Bibliography 

 Jones, Arnold Hugh Martin, John Robert Martindale, John Morris, "Anicius Acilius Aginantius Faustus iunior (albus) 4", The Prosopography of the Later Roman Empire, Cambridge University Press, 1992, p. 451–452.

5th-century Italo-Roman people
6th-century Italo-Roman people
5th-century Roman consuls
6th-century Latin writers
Faustus, Anicius Acilius Aginantius
Acilii
Correspondents of Ecdicius Avitus
Correspondents of Ennodius
Imperial Roman consuls
Urban prefects of Rome